Middleton Park is an electoral ward of Leeds City Council in south Leeds, West Yorkshire, including the urban suburbs of Middleton and Belle Isle. The ward is named after the public park and former manorial estate of Middleton Park.

Demographics

In 2010, the ward had 27,487 inhabitants, of which 52.2% of the population were female and 47.8% male. 21.5% were aged 15 or under compared with an England average of 18.7%. Life Expectancy for males and females is more than three years less than the rest of Leeds. In 2001, 96.3% of residents  identified as White British, 71.6% identifying as Christian and over 18% having no religion. Most houses in the ward are in the Council Tax Bands A and B. In April 2012, 1,493 (8.3%) people claimed Jobseeker's Allowance, nearly double the Leeds' average at the time. While all recorded crime was below the Leeds' average, criminal damage was substantially higher and nearly twice the England average.

Councillors 

 indicates seat up for re-election.
* indicates incumbent councillor.

Elections since 2010

May 2022

May 2021

May 2019

May 2018

May 2016

May 2015

May 2014

May 2012

May 2011

May 2010

See also
Listed buildings in Leeds (Middleton Park Ward)

Notes

References

Wards of Leeds